Île-de-France is an uninhabited island of the Greenland Sea, Greenland. The island has an area of 246.1 km ² and a shoreline of 71.9 kilometres. It lies off the southern part of Jokel Bay and southeast of the Danske Islands.

Skaer Fjord is located southwest of Île-de-France's southern end. It is a broad fjord or bay with several arms extending westwards from it.

History
This island was named in 1905 by the Duke of Orléans during his Duke of Orléans Arctic Expedition when he explored parts of the northeastern coast of Greenland on ship Belgica.

See also
List of islands of Greenland

References

Uninhabited islands of Greenland